Traiguen Island is an island in the Chonos Archipelago of Chile. The geological formation of Traiguén is named after the island.

See also
 List of islands of Chile

External links
 UN

Chonos Archipelago
South American sea lion colonies